Dja Faunal Reserve, located in southeastern Cameroon, is a UNESCO World Heritage Site inscribed in 1987. Causes of inscription include diversity of species present in the park, the presence of five threatened species of mammal, and lack of disturbance within the park. It is managed by Dja Conservation Services (DCS), which is led by a conservator. The Reserve receives significant support for its management from many projects funded by international partners and supporters of conservation in Cameroon.

Geology
The Dja River almost completely surrounds the reserve and forms a natural boundary which encloses .

History

The Dja Faunal Reserve was created in 1950 and became a World Heritage Site in 1987 and it forms an integral part of the dense rain forests that make up the Congo Basin. It is one of the largest and best-protected reserves within the rainforest zones of Africa with around 90% of its area remaining undisturbed. The Dja Faunal Reserve is especially notable for the diversity of primate species it protects including white-collared mangabey, mandrill, drill, western lowland gorilla and chimpanzee. It adjoins onto the Congolese reserve of the  Odzala-Kokoua National Park and the Gabonese Minkébé National Park to form the TRIDOMarea, an important zone for the protection of the African rainforest habitat of the Congo basin.

Fauna
There are more than 1,500 known plant species in the reserve, over 107 mammals (including forest elephants, African forest buffalo and leopard) and more than 320 bird species. There is also a population of Baka pygmies living in a relatively traditional manner within the boundaries of the reserve. They confer a recognized cultural value to the site and are permitted to hunt using traditional methods, although agriculture and professional hunting are banned.

References

External links 
 For visitor information see www.dja.cm
 UNEP World Conservation Monitoring Centre: faktaark
 UNESCO Fact Sheet

Protected areas of Cameroon
Biosphere reserves of Cameroon
World Heritage Sites in Cameroon
Faunal reserves